Congenital insensitivity to pain (CIP), also known as congenital analgesia, is one or more extraordinarily rare conditions in which a person cannot feel (and has never felt) physical pain. The conditions described here are separate from the HSAN group of disorders, which have more specific signs and cause. Because feeling physical pain is vital for survival, CIP is an extremely dangerous condition. It is common for people with the condition to die in childhood due to injuries or illnesses going unnoticed. Burn injuries are among the more common injuries.

Signs and symptoms 

For people with this disorder, cognition and sensation are otherwise normal; for instance, patients can still feel discriminative touch (though not always temperature), and there are generally no detectable physical abnormalities.

Because children and adults with the disorder cannot feel pain, they may not respond to problems, thus being at a higher risk of more severe diseases. Children with this condition often sustain oral cavity damage both in and around the oral cavity (such as having bitten off the tip of their tongue) or fractures to bones. Unnoticed infections and corneal damage due to foreign objects in the eye are also seen.

There are generally two types of non-response exhibited:
 Insensitivity to pain means that the painful stimulus is not even perceived: a patient cannot describe the intensity or type of pain.
 Indifference to pain means that the patient can perceive the stimulus, but lacks an appropriate response: they do not flinch or withdraw when exposed to pain.

Causes 
It may be that the condition is caused by increased production of endorphins in the brain. In this case, naloxone may be a treatment, but it does not always work.
In all cases, this disorder can be  in the voltage-gated sodium channel SCN9A (Nav1.7). Patients with such mutations are congenitally insensitive to pain and lack other neuropathies. There are three mutations in SCN9A: W897X, located in the P-loop of domain 2; I767X, located in the S2 segment of domain 2; and S459X, located in the linker region between domains 1 and 2. This results in a truncated non-functional protein. Nav1.7 channels are expressed at high levels in nociceptive neurons of the dorsal root ganglia. As these channels are likely involved in the formation and propagation of action potentials in such neurons, it is expected that a loss of function mutation in SCN9A leads to abolished nociceptive pain propagation.

PRDM12 gene is normally switched on during the development of pain-sensing nerve cells. People with homozygous mutations of the PRDM12 gene experience congenital insensitivity to pain (CIP).

Homozygous microdeletion in the FAAH-OUT pseudogene of the fatty acid amide hydrolase chromosomal region that is expressed in the brain and dorsal root ganglia was identified as the cause of congenital analgesia in a single individual. The individual experienced lifelong insensitivity to pain and was oblivious to cuts and burns, did not experience pain during childbirth, did not experience pain from degeneration of a hip that required hip replacement surgery, and did not require analgesics for postoperative pain. Furthermore, the individual exhibited expedited wound healing and reduced scarring, could not sense heat from chili peppers, did not experience depression, fear, and anxiety and lacked a normal fear response to erratic and aggressive behaviour. However, the individual also experienced slight memory impairment (was prone to losing the trail of thought while speaking, and experienced some forgetfulness), and could not experience thrill ("adrenaline rush").

Another gene implicated in human pain insensitivity is ZFHX2, which encodes zinc finger homeobox 2. A 2018 study analysed six members of a family with inherited pain insensitivity and identified a "novel point mutation in ZFHX2, encoding a putative transcription factor expressed in small diameter sensory neurons", as the cause. As a therapeutic application, the study further discuses how "the ZFHX2 variant and downstream regulated genes associated with a human pain-insensitive phenotype are ... potential novel targets for the development of new analgesic drugs".

Developmental disabilities such as autism can include varying degrees of pain insensitivity as a sign. However, since these disorders are characterized by dysfunction of the sensory system in general, autism is not in itself an indicator of congenital insensitivity to pain.

Treatment
The opioid antagonist naloxone allowed a woman with congenital insensitivity to pain to experience it for the first time. Similar effects were observed in Nav1.7 null mice treated with naloxone. As such, opioid antagonists like naloxone and naltrexone may be effective in treating the condition.

Epidemiology 
It has been estimated to have a worldwide incidence of approximately 1 in every 25,000 live births.

Congenital insensitivity to pain is found at an abnormally high frequency in Vittangi, a village in Kiruna Municipality in northern Sweden, where nearly 40 cases have been reported.

See also 
 Hereditary sensory and autonomic neuropathy
 Familial dysautonomia
 Congenital insensitivity to pain with anhidrosis
 Hypoalgesia
 Pain asymbolia

References

External links 
 "The Hazards of Growing Up Painlessly" By Justin Heckert, New York Times, November 15, 2012. Profile of Ashlyn Blocker, 13, who has congenital insensitivity to pain.

Congenital disorders of nervous system
Rare diseases
Syndromes
Channelopathies
Pain
Articles containing video clips